Decyl(triphenyl)phosphonium (DTPP) is the organophosphorus cation with the formula C10H21P(C6H5)3+. It is a lipophilic quaternary phosphonium cation. It forms the basis for many mitochondrial-targeted drugs, including MitoQ, MitoE, and SkQ. It binds to the mitochondrial matrix by insertion into the inner membrane.
DTPP itself can cause mitochondrial swelling in kidney tissue, an action possibly related to increased membrane permeability.

References

Further reading 

 

Quaternary phosphonium compounds